BrainBanx is a six-issue comic book limited series published in 1997 as part of the short-lived DC Comics imprint, Helix. Written by Elaine Lee and featuring artwork by Jason Temujin Minor, the title narrates the tale of the red-headed Anna Elysian, a telepathic intelligence operative working undercover in a distant future world.

Plot synopsis
Anna is a 'Mount' which means that she is an agent who shares her body and her consciousness with one of the corporeal occupants ('volunteers') of the BrainBanx (or 'pool'), a series of sophisticated  life-support tanks administered by the galactic government. In Anna's case, she is joined with Ellis Shepherd (or 'Shep') a former employee of the Organic Ranching Corporation (ORC) who has fled his position upon discovering evidence of certain prohibited cross-breeding experiments that ORC had been performing with sheep.

As the series unfolds, Anna uncovers illegal plans to grow human brains in the bodies of animals and must also reconcile her emerging feelings for Shep with whom she shares her mind and body.

Themes
In her foreword to the series, Elaine Lee described her wish to focus on human relationships in the title:

References

1997 comics debuts
Biopunk comics
Science fiction comics
Fiction books about telepathy